This is a list of alumni of the University of Oxford by the academic discipline of their degree(s). Many were also students at one (or more) of the colleges of the University. Some people multiple times, under different discipline headings.

This list forms part of a series of lists of people associated with the University of Oxford; for other lists, please see the main article List of University of Oxford people.

Law

History

Classics

Politics, Philosophy and Economics

Oriental Studies

Philosophy

Politics

Economics

Mathematics

Medicine and Healthcare

Lists of people associated with the University of Oxford